Governor Floyd may refer to:

Charles M. Floyd (1861–1923), 51st Governor of New Hampshire
John Floyd (Virginia politician) (1783–1837), 25th Governor of Virginia
John B. Floyd (1806–1863), 31st Governor of Virginia